Verónica Castro (born 26 June 1979) is a Spanish gymnast. She competed in six events at the 1996 Summer Olympics.

References

1979 births
Living people
Spanish female artistic gymnasts
Olympic gymnasts of Spain
Gymnasts at the 1996 Summer Olympics
Sportspeople from Gijón
20th-century Spanish women